IFAP may refer to:

International Fashion Academy Pakistan
International Federation of Agricultural Producers